The Kitakyushu Champions Cup commemorates the 2002 Gold Cup World Wheelchair Basketball Championships in Kitakyushu, which was the first to be held in Asia.  2011 tournament is the ninth to be held, demonstrating the vitality of our citizens and the united efforts of volunteers, and also promoting Kitakyushu City as a model barrier-free city. This tournament is being held as the first-ever world club team championships.

Results

See also
Wheelchair basketball
IWBF Champions Cup
André Vergauwen Cup
Willi Brinkmann Cup
IWBF Challenge Cup

Wheelchair basketball competitions between national teams
International basketball competitions hosted by Japan
2003 establishments in Japan
Sports competitions in Kitakyushu